Rosa 'Over the Moon',  (aka ORAclelon ), is a hybrid tea rose  cultivar, bred by Pierre Orard in France, and introduced into the United States by Weeks Wholesale Rose Growers in 2009. It won the Portland Gold Medal in 2013.

Description
'Over the Moon' is a medium-tall, bushy, upright shrub, 4 to 5 ft (121—152 cm) in height with a 2 to 3 ft (60—91 cm) spread. Blooms are large, 4—5 in (10—12 cm) in diameter, with over 30 petals.  Flowers have a very double, high-centered to cupped bloom form and are borne mostly solitary. The flowers are an apricot blend with a yellow reverse. The rose has a mild, apple  fragrance and leathery, semi-glossy, medium green foliage.  'Over the Moon' blooms in flushes throughout its growing season. The plant does not do well in warmer climates.

Awards  
 Portland Gold Medal, (2013)

See also
Garden roses
Rose Hall of Fame
List of Award of Garden Merit roses

References

Over the Moon